The sage thrasher (Oreoscoptes montanus) is a medium-sized passerine bird from the family Mimidae, which also includes mockingbirds, tremblers, and New World catbirds. It is the only member of the genus Oreoscoptes. This seems less close to the Caribbean thrashers, but rather to the mockingbirds instead (Hunt et al. 2001, Barber et al. 2004).

Description 

Oreoscoptes montanus are pale grey-brown on the upperparts and white with dark streaks on the underparts. They have a slim straight relatively short bill, yellow eyes and a long tail, although not as long as that of other thrashers.

Measurements:

 Length: 7.9-9.1 in (20-23 cm)
 Weight: 1.4-1.8 oz (40-50 g)
 Wingspan: 12.6 in (32 cm)

Breeding 
As its name suggests, this bird breeds in western North America, from southern Canada to northern Arizona and New Mexico. Its breeding habitat is in areas with dense stands of sagebrush and rarely in other shrubby areas. The female lays 4 or 5 eggs in a twiggy cup nest built in a low bush. Both parents incubate and feed the young birds.

Migrating 
In winter, these birds migrate to the southernmost United States and Mexico, including the Baja Peninsula, north and south.

Diet 
They mainly eat insects in summer; they also eat berries, especially in winter. They usually search for insects on the ground in brushy locations.

Vocalization 
The male bird sings a series of warbled notes to defend his nesting territory.

Conservation 
These birds have declined in some areas where sagebrush has been removed but are still common where suitable habitat remains.  The continued decline of sagebrush habitats in western North America is cause for alarm for this and other sagebrush dependent species.

References

Barber, Brian R.; Martínez-Gómez, Juan E. & Peterson, A. Townsend (2004): Systematic position of the Socorro mockingbird Mimodes graysoni. J. Avian Biol. 35: 195–198.  (HTML abstract)
Hunt, Jeffrey S.; Bermingham, Eldredge; & Ricklefs, Robert E. (2001): Molecular systematics and biogeography of Antillean thrashers, tremblers, and mockingbirds (Aves: Mimidae). Auk 118(1): 35–55. DOI:10.1642/0004-8038(2001)118[0035:MSABOA]2.0.CO;2 HTML fulltext without images

External links

 Sage Thrasher Species Account - Cornell Lab of Ornithology
 Sage Thrasher Oreoscoptes montanus - USGS Patuxent Bird Identification InfoCenter
 Sage Thrasher photo gallery VIREO
 Sage Thrasher videos on the Internet Bird Collection
 Photo and description - Utah Division of Wildlife Resources

sage thrasher
sage thrasher
Native birds of Western Canada
Native birds of the Canadian Prairies
Native birds of the Western United States
Birds of the Great Basin
sage thrasher
sage thrasher